Gun or Gunn is an old name formed from gunnr (battle) and is cognate with the Old English word "gúð". Gunnr is one of the valkyries. The equivalent male name is Gunnar.

The earliest attestation of the name is on the Rök runestone where it occurs as part of a kenning for wolf:
I say this the twelfth, where the horse of Gunnr sees fodder on the battlefield, where twenty kings lie...

Gun is the 56th most common female name in Sweden as of December 31, 2008, when 34,655 living people were named Gun in Sweden.

Famous Guns 

 Atthaphan Phunsawat, also known as Gun Atthaphan, Thai actor 
 Gun Adler, actress 
 Gun Nathalie Björn, Swedish footballer
 Gun Andersson, actress 
 Gun Arvidsson, actress 
 Gun Carlson, politician
 Gun Fors, actress 
 Gun Hellberg, actress 
 Gun Hellsvik, Swedish minister for Justice
 Gun Holmquist, actress  
 Gun Holmqvist, actress  
 Gun Jönsson, actress 
 Gun Kessle, artist, married to Jan Myrdal
 Gun Korawit Boonsri, Thai actor 
 Gun Lund, dancer and choreographer
 Gun Robertson, actress 
 Gun Skoogberg, ballerina
 Gun Chartree Sithananun, Thai guitarist

References

General sources
English etymology of Norse names, referencing other names with gunnr root
Swedish-language source

Swedish feminine given names